Cát Bà Island is the largest of the 367 islands spanning 260 km2 (100 sq mi) that comprise the Cat Ba Archipelago, which makes up the southeastern edge of Lan Ha Bay in Northern Vietnam. Cat Ba island has a surface area of 285 km2 (110 sq mi) and maintains the dramatic and rugged features of Ha Long Bay.

History of Cat Ba Island 
Cat Ba (historically called Cac Ba) Island means "Women’s Island" (Cac meaning 'all' and 'Ba' meaning women). Legend has it that many centuries ago, three women of the Tran Dynasty were killed and their bodies floated all the way to Cat Ba Island.  Each body washed up on a different beach and all three were found by local fishermen.  The residents of Cat Ba built a temple for each woman, and the island soon became known as Cat Ba.

Archaeological evidence suggests that people have lived on Cat Ba Island for almost 6,000 years, with the earliest settlements being found on the southeastern tip of the Island close to the area where Ben Beo harbour sits today.  In 1938, a group of French archaeologists discovered human remains belonging "to the Cai Beo people of the Ha Long culture, which lived between 4,000 and 6,500 years ago… considered to be perhaps the first population group occupying the northeastern territorial waters of Vietnam… [and] the Cai Beo people may be an intermediary link between the population strata at the end of the Neolithic Age, some 4,000 years ago."

In more recent history, Cat Ba Island was inhabited mostly by Viet-Chinese fisherman and was largely influenced by both the French and American wars.  The island was a strategic look-out point and bombing during the wars often forced local residents to hide among the Island's many caves.  Today, the best reminders of the two wars have been turned into tourist attractions.  Hospital Cave, which was a secret, bomb-proof hospital during the American War and as a safe house for VC leaders.  This three-storey feat of engineering was in use until 1975 is only 10 km north of Cat Ba town.  The second attraction, the newly built Cannon Fort, sits on a peak 177 meters high, offering visitors a chance to see old bunkers and helicopter landing stations as well as views of Cat Ba Island, its coast, and the limestone karsts in Lan Ha Bay offshore.

In 1979, the third Indo-China War broke out between China and Vietnam in response to Vietnam's invasion of Cambodia that ended the reign of the Khmer Rouge.  Relations between China and Vietnam collapsed, leading to the Vietnamese government evicting around 30,000 ... of the fishermen, and most of the rest of the Chinese community from the greater Ha Long area.

Tourism 
Today, increases in infrastructure on the Island (including the building of bigger roads, dams to build harbors and to protect Cat Ba town from flooding, consistent electricity being brought to the island (which surprisingly happened as late as 1997) instead of having to rely on a generator, and large ferries and barges, able to transport trucks and cars to the Island from the mainland making daily trips to Cat Ba)  made it easier for tourists to visit the Island, leading to a rapid increase in tourism and development in Cat Ba town starting in 2001.  Since then, a stop on Cat Ba Island has been included in the itinerary of many Ha Long Bay cruises and a strip of tall, thin, five-storey budget hotels line the seafront, receiving more than 350,000 visitors a year.

Currently, over 150 hotels are listed in Cat Ba Island's tourist directory pamphlet, from cheap budget hotels to flashier upscale resorts, and construction is underway on many more.  Right now, construction is under way on the colossal Cat Ba Amatina, an enormous project that will transform the southern coast of the island.  The Amatina compound will be "a world-class integrated marina, casino, resort and theme park" spanning 171.57 hectares and (VITC) will be able to host almost 6,000 residents at a time.  The Amatina will boast "seven resorts with over 800 villas, three marinas, one international convention palace, six five-star hotels  and one four-star hotel" (VITC).  The scale of this project is gigantic and will basically create a luxurious mini-city on Cat Ba and will attract tourists from around the world.

Cat Ba Island has become the adventure-tourism capital of Vietnam, and many of the activities advertised are nature-based.  Visitors can kayak and take boat cruises through Ha Long Bay and the Cat Ba Archipelago, hike through the national park, mountain bike around the Island, spend time hiking and swimming on Monkey Island just offshore, tourist can stay at Monkey Island Resort for real relax time on private beach, explore the Island's many caves, swim on Cat Co 1, 2, or 3 (three sandy beaches a short walk from Cat Ba town), or even go rock climbing and deep water soloing on the limestone karsts in Lan Ha Bay. With so many things to do, Cat Ba Island is slowly gaining popularity as an alternative to the crowded Ha Long Bay Town.

With its scenery, its association with Ha Long Bay, its proximity to cities like Haiphong (50 km) and Hanoi (150 km), and even China (many regional visitors come to the Island in the summer, the busy season, to avoid the heat and pollution in the cities), and plenty to do, Cat Ba Island has become a major travel destination for foreign and Vietnamese visitors alike.

Cat Ba tour organizer: Cat Ba Express, Kivo travel, Vietnam travel, Pys Travel...

Cat Ba National Park 
At the heart of Cat Ba Island lies an ecologically diverse national park.  In 1986, 9,800 [98 km2] hectares (approximately one-third of the Island's total land mass) was annexed as Cát Bà National Park, the first decreed protected area in Vietnam to include a marine component (Dawkins 14).  It had previously been the site of a timber company.  In 2006, the boundaries of the national park were redefined, so the park contained 109 km2 of land area and an additional 52 km2 of inshore waters and mangrove-covered tidal zones (langur website).  The park is staffed by 92 people, including over 60 park rangers.  

In 2004, Cat Ba Archipelago was declared a UNESCO Man and Biosphere Reserve Area in order to protect the multiple terrestrial and aquatic ecosystems as well the diverse plant and animal life that is found on the Island.  The UNESCO designation divides the archipelago into three distinct areas, each with certain functions and restrictions that regulate development and conservation measures on the Island:

Core area 
The core area needs to be legally established and is not subject to human activity, except research and monitoring, and as the case may be, to traditional extractive uses by local communities.  Cat Ba National Park more or less constitutes the core zone of the Cat Ba Archipelago Biosphere Reserve. (8,500 hectares, of which 2,000 are marine)

Buffer zone 
The buffer zone must surround or be contiguous to the core area.  Activities are organized here so that they do not hinder the conservation objectives of the core area but rather help to protect it.  It can be an area for experimental research and it may accommodate education, tourism, and recreational facilities. (7,741 hectares, of which 2,800 are marine)

Outer transitional area 
To provide support for research, monitoring, education, and information exchange related to local, national, and global issues of conservation and development. (10,000 hectares, of which 4,400 are marine)

Goals of the National Park 
The first purpose is conservation, and the park is primarily committed to protecting the nature and wildlife in the archipelago.  The second purpose is scientific research, and the third purpose is to promote eco-tourism and environmental education.  A fourth priority is to increase the economic development of the small communities living in the buffer zones of the national park through eco-tourism and conservation programs, that balance both conservation and economic goals.

Biodiversity 
Besides its natural environment, the park is home to a high number of species. There are 1,561 recorded species of flora found in the park, from 186 families, including 406 species of woody plants, 661 medicinal plants, and 196 edible plants. The fauna on the island consists of 279 species, including 53 mammal species from 18 families, and 23 Endangered and Critically Endangered species.

There are 160 bird species, 66 species of reptiles and amphibians, and 274 species of insects from 79 different families.  Aquatically, there are 900 sea fish, 178 species of coral, 7 species of sea snakes, 4 species of sea turtles, and 21 species of seaweed found throughout the archipelago.

The Cat Ba langur 
The Cat Ba langur (Trachypithecus poliocephalus), or golden-headed langur, is endemic to Cat Ba Island and is one of the most endangered primates in the world.  The langurs' population numbers, which used to be between 2,400 and 2,700, dwindled to as low as only 53 langurs in 2000 due to poaching for traditional medicine and habitat fragmentation caused by human development.

Today, there are approximately 68 langurs left in the wild. The langur population and its habitat is monitored by the Cat Ba Langur Conservation Project (CBLCP), a German-based NGO that works in close cooperation with the national park staff and the local governments on Cat Ba Island and in Hai Phong province, especially the Department of Agriculture and Rural Development in Hai Phong, to protect the langur, its habitat, and to help conserve the biodiversity and environmental integrity of the entire Cat Ba Archipelago. difficulties the project has faced in the past and will face going forward.  The CBLCP is an in situ conservation project, meaning the project works to protect both the animal and its habitat (there are no plans to put the langurs in zoos).  This means that by taking efforts to preserve the langurs, the CBLCP, by protecting the natural environment of the archipelago, really works to preserve all the species found on the archipelago and to protect the overall health of the forest.

The biggest reason for the steep decline in langur population numbers was illegal poaching and trapping of the langurs for traditional medicinal purposes.  This is a difficult trend to reverse, as the langur was being poached by local people who relied on the forest for subsistence and sold langurs to support their meagre income, and from poachers outside the Island who are part of the international illegal wildlife trade.  Another major threat facing the langurs is habitat fractionalization, due to increases in human development.  Currently, the langur population is fragmented into seven isolated sub-populations at five different locations on Cat Ba Island, with most of the langur groups being very small in number with some populations longer functional in terms of reproduction (only three groups are currently reproducing). The fragmentation of the langur population reduces genetic variability, which is already a major problem due to the minute population numbers and makes it impossible for some groups of langurs to reproduce and replace aging group members.

To fight this problem, the CBLCP focused their efforts on two approaches: increasing education and awareness levels about the decline of the langur population and other conservation issues and creating a protection network that relies on the local population.  These two approaches both take great effort and care to engage the residents of Cat Ba Island, which makes the programs more effective.  The CBLCP also takes an active approach in raising levels of environmental awareness and education on Cat Ba Island; they also strive to create a connection between the citizens of Cat Ba Island and the natural environment.  
Other mammals in the Park include civet cats and oriental giant squirrels.

Environmental problems 
Cat Ba Island faces numerous environmental problems.  Increases in tourism and recent developments threaten the ecological integrity and biodiversity of the island, reducing and fragmenting the natural habitat for Cat Ba's numerous species.  Illegal hunting and poaching, overfishing, and water pollution in Ha Long Bay continue to threaten the ecological health of the island.

Many tour operators include an option of trekking in the National Park or canoeing on three-day tours; shorter tours generally only stay overnight in the small town of Cat Ba (population about 8,000) or on boats moored in Cai Beo bay, about 2 km away from Cat Ba town.  Cat Ba itself is attractively situated around a bay teeming with small boats, many of which belong to pearl or shrimp farmers, and can become very busy at weekends and during public holidays. The promenade has illuminations and a large fountain which only plays after dark; it is backed by a strip of cheap hotels and bars, but dominated by the wooded limestone hills behind. The island is a national park of Vietnam and was recognized by UNESCO in December 2004 as a Biosphere reserve of the world.

Hai Phong's people committee, as well as the Vietnam Government, have cooperated with many organizations to educate local citizens to help protect the environment. They also communicate with the tourism board to promote a variety of campaigns to make Cat Ba Island greener.

References

Dawkins, Zoe.  "The Social Impact of People-Oriented Conservation on Cat Ba Island, Viet Nam." Canberra: Australian National University, Research School of the Pacific and Asian Studies, Resource Management in the Asia Pacific Program (Working Paper 68). 2007.
Ray, Nick, ed. Vietnam.  Oakland: Lonely Planet Publications, 10th Edition, 2009.
Hayton, Bill.  "Vietnam: Rising Dragon."  New Haven: Yale University Press: 2010.
Cat Ba Island Tourist Directory Pamphlet.  "Cat Ba Today." The Center for Rural Progress, Hanoi.
The Cat Ba Langur Conservation Project Information Pamphlet.  "Cat Ba Langur."  Cat Ba Island: 2009.

External links

UNESCO Biosphere Reserve Information: Cat Ba
Vietnam National Parks & Reserves

Cat Ba Langur
The Cat Ba Langur. Cat Ba Langur Conservation Project. Accessed 2008-07-15.
Seacology Cat Ba Langur Project Seacology

Islands of Vietnam
Biosphere reserves of Vietnam
National parks of Vietnam
Landforms of Haiphong
Gulf of Tonkin
Archipelagoes of Vietnam